Ritchie is an unincorporated community in southern Will County, Illinois, United States. It is located along Forked Creek and Illinois Route 102, three miles southeast of the city of Wilmington in Wesley Township.

Ritchie is home to several dozen houses, the Wesley Township hall, a church, a grain elevator, and the house of the founder of Ritchie. His house is located at the eastern entry into Ritchie along Illinois Route 102. A railroad track passing through the community was dismantled in the 1990s, but the bridge that carried it over Forked Creek and Route 102 remains.

Notes

Unincorporated communities in Will County, Illinois
Unincorporated communities in Illinois